Glencoe is an unincorporated community in Baltimore County, Maryland, United States. Glencoe was listed on the National Register of Historic Places in 1983.

References

Unincorporated communities in Baltimore County, Maryland
Unincorporated communities in Maryland